The Stramenopiles, also called Heterokonts, are a clade of organisms distinguished by the presence of stiff tripartite external hairs.  In most species, the hairs are attached to flagella, in some they are attached to other areas of the cellular surface, and in some they have been secondarily lost (in which case relatedness to stramenopile ancestors is evident from other shared cytological features or from genetic similarity). Stramenopiles represent one of the three major clades in the SAR supergroup, along with Alveolata and Rhizaria.

Stramenopiles are eukaryotes; since they are neither fungi, animals, nor plants, they are classified as protists. Most stramenopiles are single-celled, but some are multicellular algae including some brown algae.  The group includes a variety of algal protists, heterotrophic flagellates, opalines and closely related proteromonad flagellates (all endobionts in other organisms); the actinophryid heliozoa, and oomycetes. The tripartite hairs have been lost in some stramenopiles - for example in most diatoms (although these organisms still express mastigonemic proteins - see below).

Many stramenopiles are unicellular flagellates, and most others produce flagellated cells at some point in their lifecycles, for instance as gametes or zoospores.  Most flagellated heterokonts have two flagella; the anterior flagellum has one or two rows of stiff hairs or mastigonemes, and the posterior flagellum is without such embellishments, being smooth, usually shorter, or in a few cases not projecting from the cell.

History  

The term 'stramenopile' was introduced by D. J. Patterson in 1989, defining a group that overlapped with the ambiguously defined heterokonts. The name "stramenopile" has been discussed by J. C. David.

The heterokont problem 

The term 'heterokont' is used as both an adjective – indicating that a cell has two dissimilar flagella – and as the name of a taxon. The taxon 'Heterokontae' was introduced in 1899 by Alexander Luther for algae that are now considered the Xanthophyceae. But the same term was used for other groupings of algae. For example, in 1956, Copeland used it to include the xanthophytes (using the name Vaucheriacea), a group that included what became known as the chrysophytes, the silicoflagellates, and the hyphochytrids.  Copeland also included the unrelated collar flagellates (as the choanoflagellates) in which he placed the bicosoecids.  He also included the not-closely-related haptophytes.  The consequence of associating multiple concepts to the taxon 'heterokont' is that the meaning of 'heterokont' can only be made clear by making reference to its usage: Heterokontae sensu Luther 1899; Heterokontae sensu Copeland 1956, etc. This contextual clarification is rare, such that when the taxon name is used, it is unclear how it should be understood. The term 'Heterokont' has lost its usefulness in critical discussions about the identity, nature, character and relatedness of the group. The term 'stramenopile' sought to identify a clade (monophyletic and holophyletic lineage) using the approach developed by transformed cladists of pointing to a defining innovative characteristic or apomorphy.

Over time, the scope of application has changed, especially when in the 1970s ultrastructural studies revealed greater diversity among the algae with chromoplasts (chlorophylls a and c) than had previously been recognized.  At the same time, a protistological perspective was replacing the 19th century one based on the division of unicellular eukaryotes into animals and plants.  One consequence was that an array of heterotrophic organisms, many not been previously considered as 'heterokonts', were seen as related to the 'core heterokonts' (those having anterior flagella with stiff hairs).  Newly recognized relatives included the parasitic opalines, proteromonads, and actinophryid heliozoa. They joined other heterotrophic protists, such as bicosoecids, labyrinthulids, and oomycete fungi, that were included by some as heterokonts and excluded by others.  Rather than continue to use a name whose meaning had changed over time and was hence ambiguous, the name 'stramenopile' was introduced to refer to the clade of protists that had tripartite stiff (usually flagellar) hairs and all their descendents. Molecular studies confirm that the genes that code for the proteins of these hairs are exclusive to stramenopiles.

Characteristics 

The presumed apomorphy of tripartite flagellar hairs in stramenopiles is well characterized. The basal part of the hair is flexible and inserts into the cell membrane; the second part is dominated by a long stiff tube (the 'straw' or 'stramen'); and finally the tube is tipped by many delicate hairs called mastigonemes. The proteins that code for the mastigonemes appear to be exclusive to the stramenopile clade, and are present even in taxa (such as diatoms) that no longer have such hairs. 

Most stramenopiles have two flagella near the apex. They are usually supported by four microtubule roots in a distinctive pattern. There is a transitional helix inside the flagellum where the beating axoneme with its distinctive 9 peripheral couplets and two central microtubules changes into the nine triplet structure of the basal body.

Plastids 

Many stramenopiles have plastids which enable them to photosynthesise, using light to make their own food. Those plastids are coloured off-green, orange, golden or brown because of the presence of chlorophyll a, chlorophyll c, and fucoxanthin. This form of plastid is called a stramenochrome or chromoplast.  The most significant autotrophic stramenopiles are the brown algae (wracks and many other seaweeds), and the diatoms. The latter are among the most significant primary producers in marine and freshwater ecosystems. Most molecular analyses suggest that the most basal stramenopiles lacked plastids and were accordingly colourless heterotrophs, feeding on other organisms. This implies that the stramenopiles arose as heterotrophs, diversified, and then some of them acquired chromoplasts. Some lineages (such as the axodine lineage that included the chromophytic pedinellids, colourless ciliophryids, and colourless actinophryid heliozoa) have secondarily reverted to heterotrophy.

Ecology 
 

Some stramenopiles are significant as autotrophs and as heterotrophs in natural ecosystems; others are parasitic. 
Blastocystis is a parasite of humans; 
opalines and proteromonads live in the intestines of cold-blooded vertebrates and have been called parasites;
oomycetes include some significant plant pathogens such as the cause of potato blight, Phytophthora infestans. 
Diatoms are major contributors to global carbon cycles because they are the most important autotrophs in most marine habitats. 
The brown algae, including familiar seaweeds like wrack and kelp, are major autotrophs of the intertidal and subtidal marine habitats. 
Some of the bacterivorous stramenopiles, such as Cafeteria are common and widespread consumers of bacteria, and thus play a major role in recycling carbon and nutrients within microbial food webs.

Phylogeny

External 

Stramenopiles are most closely related to Alveolates and Rhizaria - all with tubular mitochondrial cristae and collectively forming the SAR supergroup, whose name is formed from their initials. The ancestor of the SAR supergroup appears to have captured a unicellular photosynthetic red alga, and many Stramenopiles, as well as members of other SAR groups such as the Rhizaria, still have plastids which retain the double membrane of the red alga and a double membrane surrounding it, for a total of four membranes.

Internal 

The tree is based on Ruggiero et al. 2015 & Silar 2016.

Classification 

The classification of the Stramenopiles according to Adl et al. (2012) is:

 Stramenopiles , 1989, emend.  et al., 2005
 Opalinata , 1926, emend. , 1997 (Slopalinida , 1985)
 Blastocystis , 1911
 Bicosoecida , 1926, emend. , 1998
 Placidida  et al., 2002
 Labyrinthulomycetes , 2001
 Hyphochytriales , 1960
 Peronosporomycetes , 2001 (Öomycetes , 1897, emend. , 1976)
 Actinophryidae  1874, emend.  1926
 Bolidomonas , 1999 (Bolidophyceae in  et al., 1999)
 Chrysophyceae , 1914
 Dictyochophyceae , 1980
 Eustigmatales , 1981
 Olisthodiscophyceae , 2021
 Pelagophyceae , 1993
 Phaeothamniophyceae , in  et al., 1998
 Pinguiochrysidales  et al., 2003
 Raphidophyceae , 1950, emend. , 1980
 Synurales , 1987
 Xanthophyceae , 1930, emend. , 1935 (Heterokontae , 1899, Heteromonadea , 1983, Xanthophyta , 1990)
 Phaeophyceae , 1886 (not , 1891, not , 1894)
 Schizocladia  et al., in  et al., 2003 (Schizocladales  et al., 2003) (M)
 Diatomea , 1821 (= Bacillariophyta , 1878)

Notes

References

External links 
 Tree of Life Web Project: Stramenopiles

SAR supergroup